Madison is a borough in Westmoreland County, Pennsylvania, United States. The population was 397 at the 2010 census. The borough was named for James Madison, fourth President of the United States.

Geography
Madison is located at  (40.248616, -79.679527).

Demographics

At the 2000 census there were 510 people, 219 households, and 158 families living in the borough. The population density was 962.6 people per square mile (371.5/km²). There were 225 housing units at an average density of 424.7 per square mile (163.9/km²).  The racial makeup of the borough was 99.41% White, 0.20% Asian, and 0.39% from two or more races.
Of the 219 households 22.8% had children under the age of 18 living with them, 62.6% were married couples living together, 6.4% had a female householder with no husband present, and 27.4% were non-families. 23.3% of households were one person and 12.8% were one person aged 65 or older. The average household size was 2.33 and the average family size was 2.74.

The age distribution was 17.1% under the age of 18, 8.8% from 18 to 24, 23.1% from 25 to 44, 32.4% from 45 to 64, and 18.6% 65 or older. The median age was 46 years. For every 100 females, there were 96.2 males. For every 100 females age 18 and over, there were 91.4 males.

The median household income was $41,875 and the median family income  was $46,250. Males had a median income of $27,321 versus $23,958 for females. The per capita income for the borough was $20,773. About 5.0% of families and 5.9% of the population were below the poverty line, including 5.7% of those under age 18 and 8.5% of those age 65 or over.

In fiction

The 1991 film My Girl takes place in Madison in the summer of 1972. Its sequel, My Girl 2, also took place in Madison in the first part, set in the 1973–74 school year.

References

Boroughs in Westmoreland County, Pennsylvania
Populated places established in 1876
Pittsburgh metropolitan area
1876 establishments in Pennsylvania